The Washington Giants were a minor league baseball team based in Washington, Indiana in 1896. The Washington Giants played as members of the Independent level Kentucky-Indiana League. The Giants preceded the 1897 Washington Browns.

History
Minor league baseball began in Washington, Indiana in 1896. The Washington Giants became members of the Independent level Kentucky-Indiana League as the league reformed during the 1896 season. The league began play as a four–team league on June 22, 1896 with franchises in Evansville, Indiana, Henderson, Kentucky, Owensboro, Kentucky and Vincennes, Indiana. When the Vincennes franchise folded, the league reformed during the season. Starting July 1, 1896, Washington joined the teams from Hopkinsville, Kentucky and Madisonville, Kentucky in the six–team league.

After  Madisonville, Henderson and Hopkinsville folded between July 29 and August 4, the Kentucky–Indiana League permanently folded on August 5, 1896. The Washington Giants placed 4th in the Kentucky–Indiana League standings in 1896. Washington finished 3.0 games behind 1st place Madisonville (15–9), the Owensboro Corncrackers (14–9) and Hopkinsville (12–12). The Giants were ahead of the Evansville Hoosiers (9–14) and Henderson (9–15) in the Kentucky–Indiana League final standings.

Washington continued play when the 1897 Washington Browns played a partial season as charter members of the Central League.

The ballpark
The exact name and location of the Washington Giants' home minor league ballpark in 1896 is not referenced.

Year–by–year records

Notable alumni
Charlie Knepper (1917)

See also
Washington Giants players

References

External links
Baseball Reference

Defunct baseball teams in Indiana
Baseball teams established in 1896
Baseball teams disestablished in 1896
Washington, Indiana
Kentucky-Indiana League teams